Portuguese Commercial Bank (BCP) is a Portuguese bank that was founded in 1985 and is the largest private bank in the country. BCP is a member of the Euronext 100 stock index and its current chief executive officer is Miguel Maya Dias Pinheiro. BCP is based in Porto, but its operations are headquartered in Oeiras, Greater Lisbon. It operates a branch brand-dubbed and restyled in 2004 as Millennium BCP as well as Banque BCP and ActivoBank.

It has nearly 4.3 million customers throughout the world and over 695 branches in Portugal. It was ranked at number 1,623 of the world's largest companies in 2017.

History
BCP was founded in 1985 by Jardim Gonçalves and a group of investors from the Porto region.

Since 2004, it operates a branch brand-dubbed and restyled as Millennium BCP, following a process of amalgamating all the brand names and complete incorporation of all commercial structures of the group's retail banking:

Nova Rede (the bank's brand for its own network of retail banking branches since 1989)
Crédibanco (network of branches created by the BCP itself in 1993)
Banco Português do Atlântico (acquired in 1995 and incorporated in 2000)
Banco Mello (acquired in 2000 and incorporated in 2000)
Banco Sotto Mayor (acquired in 2000)

Aborted merger with BPI (2007)
On 25 October 2007, a smaller Portuguese bank, BPI —Banco Português de Investimento ("Portuguese Investment Bank") offered a merger with BCP. The board of BCP initially refused as long as terms were not be revised. The merger talks failed and the two banks didn't reach an agreement.

Former operations in Canada
Bank of Montreal (BMO) purchased the Canadian division of BCP Bank in the summer of 2007. All branches in Canada remained BCP Bank branches until October 2007, when they became BMO branches. These branches continue to operate as specialty branches to Lusophone communities, including Azorean communities in Toronto, Ontario, except the Dundas Street West and University Avenue branches, which have turned towards the Chinese community.

Capital Consolidation
In 2012, Millennium in the middle of the European sovereign debt crisis, BCP received €3 billion in state support through the issuance of contingent convertible bonds with an interest rate of around 10%. 
 

In 2014, Millennium BCP raised €2.25 billion in fresh capital through a rights issue reserved for shareholders. With the results of that the bank repaid €2.25 billion of the CoCo bonds. 

As of 2015, Millennium BCP reported a profit of €235.3 million euros, returning to profits after four years of losses.

In 2017 the bank raised another €1.5 billion through a rights issue for shareholders as well as the direct sale of shares to Chinese conglomerate Fosun International. Immediately after that capital raising, Millennium BCP paid off the remaining €700 million in CoCo bonds, thereby regaining its autonomy from the state and ending any possibility of nationalization through a forced conversion of the bonds. The remaining funds from the rights issue will be used to strengthen the bank's capital ratios. 
The bank estimates it has contributed more than €1 billion to state coffers since 2012, mainly interest paid on the CoCo bonds.

Shareholder structure
As of 30 June 2018, BCP's main shareholders are Fosun International with 27.06%, Sonangol Group with 19.49%, Norges Bank with 2.544%, BlackRock with 3.39%, EDP - Energias de Portugal with 2.11%, Credit Suisse with 1.30% and Millennium Management with 0.121%

Millennium BCP Brand

The introduction of the new Millennium BCP brand, in 2004, represented the final stage of a process that formally began with the implementation of a new business model by the end of 2001, but had been triggered by the merger by incorporation of the Banks Atlântico, Mello and SottoMayor into BCP, in 2000, unifying 4 brands in one only brand known to the public—the Millennium brand. 
The brand, at the time of its launch, came to break with the standards implemented at the level of the Portuguese banking sector: a differentiating color, demonstrating innovation, modernity/youth, dynamism, and quality.

In one single night, BCP rebranded its entire commercial network, reopening in the next day surprising the market with its new color and designation.

The strategic option to implement a single brand was fundamentally due to efficiency reasons, as it would allow rationalizing the investment in several brands and the back offices to support each brand and ensure a designation that could be implemented in all geographies (one common identity).

Operations in Poland

Bank Millennium is BCP's network of branches in Poland. Bank Millennium was founded in 1989 when the Polish free market and democratic political transformations started. The bank was the first financial institution quoted on the Warsaw Stock Exchange (1992) and gained its present scale through mergers with other banks (in 1992 and 1997), as well as organic growth supported by the new business model, which has been developed in co-operation with its owner—the Portuguese bank Millennium BCP, which holds 51% of its shares. Bank Millennium, together with its subsidiaries in Poland, provides specialized financial services such as leasing, brokerage, and mutual funds, which makes it one of the largest banking groups in Poland.

References

External links

 
 
 Bank Millennium (Poland)
 Millennium bim (Mozambique)
 Millennium Private banking (Suisse)

Banks of Portugal
Banks established in 1985
Companies based in Porto
Portuguese brands
Multinational companies headquartered in Portugal
Companies listed on Euronext Lisbon
Banks under direct supervision of the European Central Bank
Portuguese companies established in 1985